The Aion S is a compact electric sedan produced by Aion, a marque of GAC Group. It was revealed at Auto Guangzhou of 2018. A new variant, the Aion S Plus, was shown in 2021.

Overview
The Aion S was unveiled at Auto Guangzhou in November 2018. It went on pre-sale in March 2019 and officially on sale in May 2019. It was New Energy's first car under the Aion brand.

There are 7 trim levels available as of July 2020, with the Mei 580 and Xuan 580 being the lowest trim level available and features a different and cheaper exterior design.

Specifications

Battery specifications
The Aion S has a  battery (in comparison, the Tesla Model 3 Long Range has a  battery).

Features
Voice integration in the car allows you to control the air conditioning, navigational system, and electronic windows. Alongside the other features is a 12.3 inch infotainment screen.

To power the interior, the car has clear solar panels on the sunroof.

Exterior design
Being the first car by Aion, the Aion S is also the first car to adopt Aion's design language that differentiates the S, LX, and V from Trumpchi vehicles.

The front-end on the exterior of the car features LED headlights, and a silver bar starting under a headlight and stretching to the other. In the middle of the bar is GAC New Energy's 'G' emblem on the blue background, similar to that of Toyota's, and their Lexus marque, logo highlighted in blue.

The rear-end features a taillight bar that goes over the 'G' logo on the trunk connecting the two taillights that are not on the trunk. The rear also uses retroreflectors on the rear bumper as an alternative to a taillight.

Sales
The Aion S has a starting price of 160,000 Chinese yuan or 23,758 US dollars or 18,034 British pounds.

Aion S Plus

Previewed by the Aion ENO.146 concept car, the Aion S Plus is a very aerodynamic vehicle, with a drag coefficient of only 0.211Cd.

Leahead iA5
The Leahead iA5 is an Aion S with different front and rear ends and a slightly changed interior and will be sold exclusively at Toyota Leahead dealerships. It is the third model in the Leahead lineup after the i1 Toyota Vitz-based subcompact hatchback and the iX4 Trumpchi GS4-based compact SUV.

GAC-Honda EA6
The EA6 is  longer than the Aion S.

See also

 Aion LX, a mid-size electric crossover by Aion
 List of GAC vehicles

References

GAC Group
S
2010s cars
Cars introduced in 2018
Cars of China
Production electric cars
Sedans